The Tenth Man is a 1936 British drama film directed by Brian Desmond Hurst and starring John Davis Lodge, Antoinette Cellier and Athole Stewart. It is based on the play The Tenth Man by W. Somerset Maugham.

Plot
George Winter (John Lodge) is a self-made businessman and M.P., who lets nothing stand in the way of his ambition, believing that nine out of ten men are rogues or fools. Whenever Winter meets a rival who can't be bought, he destroys them through methods both legal and underhand. His wife Catherine (Antoinette Cellier) is intent on divorce, but with the scandal potentially damaging to his election campaign, Winter blackmails her into staying with him. Then, Winter meets his 'tenth man': Jim Ford (Clifford Evans), a victim who refuses to be silenced by threat or bribery, who has the power to expose one of Winter's shady gold mine deals, and bring his house of cards crashing down.

Cast
 John Davis Lodge as George Winter
 Antoinette Cellier as Catherine Winter
 Athole Stewart as Lord Etchingham
 Clifford Evans as Ford
 Iris Hoey as Lady Etchingham
 Aileen Marson as Anne Echingham
 Frank Cochrane as Bennett	
 George Graves as Colonel Trent
 Bruce Lester as Edward O'Donnell
  Barry Sinclair as Robert Colby	
 Antony Holles as Swalescliffe	
 Aubrey Mallalieu as Bank Manager

Critical reception
Writing for The Spectator in 1936, Graham Greene gave the film a good review, lauding director Hurst for his "well-directed film" and noting that "there was nothing in Mr Hurst's two previous films, Riders to the Sea and Ourselves Alone, to show him capable of these humorous and satirical political sequences, and the very fine melodramatic close". Greene's only complaint was directed to the acting of actor Lodge whose performance appeared stiff.

TV Guide gave the film two out of five stars, calling it "An intriguing drama.... Cleverly written from a play by W. Somerset Maugham."

References

External links 

The Tenth Man at the website dedicated to Brian Desmond Hurst

1936 films
1936 drama films
British drama films
Films shot at British International Pictures Studios
Films directed by Brian Desmond Hurst
British black-and-white films
1930s English-language films
1930s British films